In taxonomy, the Thermococci are a class of microbes within the Euryarchaeota.

They live in extremely hot environments, such as hydrothermal vents, and they have optimal growth temperatures above 80 °C. Thermococcus and Pyrococcus (literally "balls of fire") are both obligately anaerobic chemoorganotrophs. Thermococcus prefers 70-95 °C and Pyrococcus 70-100 °C. Palaeococcus helgesonii,  recently discovered in the Tyrrhenian Sea, is an aerobic chemoheterotrophic that grows at temperatures of 45-85 °C with an optimal temperature of 80 °C. 
Thermococcus gammatolerans sp. nov. was recently discovered in the Guaymas Basin, and it grows at temperatures from 55-95 °C with an optimal temperaturearound 88 °C with an optimal pH of 6. It has pronounced radioresistance and can survive gamma radiation at 30 kGy.

See also
 List of Archaea genera

References

Further reading

External links

Archaea classes
Euryarchaeota